Deep Down may refer to:
 Deep Down (album), a 1995 album by blues musician Carey Bell
 "Deep Down" (song), a single by Pam Tillis from the album All of This Love
 Deep Down (video game), an upcoming PlayStation 4 role-playing video game by Capcom
 "Deep Down" (Angel), the first television episode from Angels fourth season
 Deep Down (film), a 1994 film